Flower is the third studio album of South Korean singer Kim Junsu, released under his stage name XIA on 3 March 2015. The album features artists Tablo, Dok2 and Naul from Brown Eyed Soul. The album debuted at first place on the Gaon Chart. JYJ's Junsu has revealed plans to release a special edition album on May 28. The special edition album will include a disco punk mix version of "X Song," an instrumental of "Flower," music videos, album jacket filming making video, a DVD including his interviews, and more than fifty previously unreleased photos.

Track listing

References

2015 albums
Kakao M albums
Korean-language albums
Kim Junsu albums